Dinesh Subba (Limbu) is a composer,  singer and lyricist of  Nepali music.

Biography
Dinesh Subba was born in 1962 in Tumsong Tea State of Darjeeling. He was greatly influenced by musical and literary ambience of Darjeeling in those days. It is yet said that every home in Darjeeling has one guitar and one singer at the least. Maestros like Ambar Gurung, Gopal Yonzon, Shanti Thatal, Sharan Ranjit, Aruna Lama, Karma Yonzon, Kumar Subba, Pema Lama, Dawa Gylamo are source of his inspiration in his musical journey.
Winning Gorkha Dukha Niwaran and Devkota Sangit in Darjeeling inspired Subba to pursue his music career seriously. Till today's date, he joyously recalls the event when he received the award from music maestro Shanti Thatal.  In the 1980s he left for Kathmandu with Rs 700 and blessings from his mother. He found a job of school teacher and music teacher. He passed then Radio Nepal's voice test in the same batch with Shambhu Rai, Thule Rai and Nishan Bhattarai.

He firmly established himself when he won Radio Nepal's singing competition in celebration of its 37th establishment. As well, he was awarded with the title of best music composer on the occasion of the 45th establishment of Radio Nepal. Veteran singer Deep Shrestha advised him that there was an opening in the then Royal Nepal Academy. He applied for the position of singer and was appointed by a government panel headed by music director (Mahasangeetkar) Amber Gurung.

His song numbers "Thaha Napai Maya Mero", "Maile Rojeko Phul" and "Dherai Dekhe Sapani Ma" (music by Mansing Thulung and lyrics by Chhetra Pratap) were hugely popular across the country. Gradually, he made his identity as a composer than a singer. He guided Ram Krishna Dhakal since his early age, in fact, Ram Krishna's first recorded song, "Hamro Sundar Sansar", was composed by him. Another popular singer, Yam Baral, made his mark by Dinesh Subba's very popular composition "Badalu ko Ghumto le". He made numerous songs with other well-known singers like Deep Shrestha, Arun Thapa,Pawan Golay, Meera Rana, Prakash Shrestha, Sunita Subba, Sukmit Gurung, Pabitra Subba, Ushakiran Adhikari, Lochan Bhattarai, Kuber Rai, Uday-Manila Sotang, Rajesh Payal, Banika Pradhan, Gyan Subba and Satya/Swarup Acharya.

Since 1996, he has been residing in Hong Kong with his family. He is still actively working and promoting Nepalese music and culture. He teaches in two schools and nurtures new talents in his own Himalaya Tones Music Academy.  He is leading the music enthusiasts in Hong Kong and acting as a bridge to associate talents between Nepal, Hong Kong and Darjeeling. "In the canvas of Air"(2009) was a documentary film based on his life directed by Rabin Rai. The income of the documentary was donated to Gyan Chakshyu Blind School in Dharan Hong Kong as a philanthropist act of Subba.

Awards
1. Winner in Gorkha Dhukha Niwarak Sammelan Darjeeling Singing Competition in 1982
2. 1st Runner up in Devkota Folk Music held by G.D.N.F.Darjeeling in 1982 
3. Winner in Radio Nepal's Singing competition on 37th anniversary  
4. Winner in Patriotic song competition held on the 40th birthday of Queen Aishwarya 
5. Winner as Music Composer in Radio Nepal's song competition in 1995
6. Hong Kong Nepalese Award by Hong Kong Nepalese Federation in 2009
7. Felicitated by Jhataro Hong Kong, Gorkha United Community of India Hong Kong
8. Felicitated by Kalanidhi Indira Sangeet Mahavidyalaya, Kirat Yaktung Chumlung, Nepal in 2013
9. Hero Hits F.M music award 2075 in best composition (modern song)

Albums 
1. Nishad by Music Nepal 
2. Mahobhav with lyricist Tanka Sambahamphe
3. Unison 
4. Ama ki Nani, A children song album
5. Samjhauta with Lyricist BN Chamling 
6. Voice of Hong Kong, compilation of 21 songs from 21 individual singers in Hong Kong
7. Nitant
8.Mutuka Pratidhuani-1 (Resonance of Hearts)
9.Mutuka Pratidhuani-2(all vocals by Pawan Golay)

Book
1.Mero bhagyamaani baja(collection of different music aspects).

References

External links
 Dinesh Subba official Website
 Fursad
 Mero UK
 Nepal japan
 Nepal Portugal
 Ekantipur
 Saaj ra Aawaj
 Nepali Collections
 Dinesh Subba Youtube
 Jindagi ko Yatra
 Timi Herchhau Bhane
 In the Canvas of Air Promo
 badalu ko ghumto le
 Hamro Sundar Sansar thiyo

Indian male singers
Musicians from West Bengal
People from Darjeeling
1962 births
Living people
Limbu people
Nepali-language singers from India